Timon and Pumbaa are an animated meerkat and warthog duo introduced in Disney's 1994 animated film The Lion King and its franchise. Timon was played through his many appearances by Nathan Lane (in all three films and early episodes of the show), Max Casella (the original actor in Broadway musical), Kevin Schon (in certain episodes of the show), Quinton Flynn (in certain episodes of the show), Bruce Lanoil in the Wild About Safety shorts and Kingdom Hearts II, while Pumbaa is voiced by Ernie Sabella (in all of his traditionally animated speaking appearances), and was portrayed by Tom Alan Robbins in the original cast of the Broadway musical. In the CGI remake, the characters are portrayed by Billy Eichner and Seth Rogen, respectively. Nathan Lane and Ernie Sabella first came to audition for the roles of the hyenas, but when the producers saw how well they worked together, they decided to cast them as Timon and Pumbaa.

As with many characters in The Lion King, Pumbaa's name derives from the East African language Swahili. In Swahili, pumbaa (v.) means "to be foolish, silly, weakminded, careless, negligent." Timon is one of the few characters whose name has no meaning in Swahili; Timon is a historical Greek name, taken to mean "he who respects." Timon's name may derive from Shakespeare's tragedy Timon of Athens, another Shakespeare reference in a film which derives its plot from Hamlet. The tragedy is based in the history of the real Timon of Athens, a famous misanthrope during the era of the Peloponnesian War, who refused life in Athens to live isolated. Another explanation is that he is named after the Greek philosopher Timon, a disciple of Pyrrho, the founder of the school of scepticism.

Timon is an insouciant and fast-talking meerkat who is known for claiming Pumbaa's ideas as his own. Pumbaa has problems with flatulence but is also a brave warrior, charging into battle like a battering ram, and taking great offense if anyone who's not his friend calls him a pig, at which point he exclaims "They call me Mister pig!"—a reference to Sidney Poitier's line "They call me Mister Tibbs!" from the 1967 film In the Heat of the Night and then screams as he charges. Unlike real meerkats, Timon can walk on his hind legs, while in real life, meerkats walk on all four legs and can only stand on their hind ones.

Appearances

The Lion King

Based on the characters Rosencrantz and Guildenstern from Hamlet, Timon and Pumbaa are played by Nathan Lane and Ernie Sabella. Timon was animated and created by Michael Surrey. They made their first appearances in the 1994 film when they chased away the vultures that swarmed around young Simba, who had collapsed from heat exhaustion. Timon and Pumbaa then took the comatose lion cub back to a small pool, where they splashed water on him to wake him up. After Simba is awakened by the two, they introduce themselves and welcome Simba to stay with them and follow their hakuna matata philosophy. At first, Simba is unsure about Timon and Pumbaa's lifestyle, but it is explained to him in the song "Hakuna Matata".

Many years later, while out on a musical walk with Timon, Pumbaa is distracted by a bug, which he follows into the jungle. The bug leads him right to a hungry lioness prowling around, who then tries to hunt down Pumbaa. She chases the warthog until Simba springs into action, and the two lions engage in conflict. When the lioness pins Simba, he recognizes her as Nala, his childhood playmate. They are happy to be together, but Timon is jealous after they leave for a night of romance. He and Pumbaa start singing the song "Can You Feel the Love Tonight?" and are joined by Simba and Nala on their night out. Still, the two help Simba fight Scar and gain his rightful place as the king of the Pride Lands, most notably when they create a hula distraction to lure away Scar's hyenas. Pumbaa single-handedly defeats Shenzi, Banzai and Ed. They also stand on top of Pride Rock along with Simba and Nala when Rafiki presents Simba and Nala's newborn cub to the animals of the Pride Lands.

The Lion King's Timon & Pumbaa

Timon and Pumbaa starred in their own animated television series which focuses on their lives. The duo is seen having many adventures in their jungle home, as well as across the globe, such as the United States, Spain, and France. This series also reveals their last names: Timon's is revealed to be Berkowitz while Pumbaa's is revealed to be Smith. It is also shown that Timon and Pumbaa celebrate Bestest Best Friend Day (which, according to Timon, was made up by Pumbaa) to dedicate their friendship.

Timon
It is revealed in the series that before Timon met Pumbaa, he had a best friend named Fred, who is a meerkat who enjoys pulling practical jokes. The episode "Isle of Manhood" also reveals Timon taking a manhood test in order to become a full-fledged meerkat.

In "Timon's Time Togo", Timon dies from eating a poisonous bug, but the meerkat angel sends him back to Earth so that he can perform one good deed in order to enter Meerkat Heaven. Timon, however, decides to never again do any good deeds so that he'll never die and leave Pumbaa forever. In another episode "The Law of the Jungle", Timon breaks the law by touching a forbidden stick. Due to that, he gets sent to a jungle court by the vulture police, where a rhino judge, known as the Wonderful Rhino of Laws, comes up with various tests for Timon to prove his innocence.

In "Timon...Alone", Timon decides to start a new life as a writer and wants to be away from Pumbaa in order to concentrate. He later realizes how lonely he is without Pumbaa and decides to find his friend and quit his new career as a writer. In another episode "Ice Escapades", Timon reveals that he dreams of becoming an ice skater and suggests that he and Pumbaa become world's famous ice skating champions. It turns out that Timon is not good at ice skating, but Pumbaa suggests that he keeps trying in order to live out his dream, which he does.

The episode "Once Upon a Timon" reveals one of the two versions of Timon's origin and how he first met Pumbaa. Timon was a member of a colony of meerkats who each had a specific duty. The kingdom was ruled by the Duke Meerkat and his daughter Princess Tatiana, whom Timon had a romantic interest in. One day when Timon had sentinel duty while the Duke was away, he was convinced by Fred to leave his post, as he found the Duke being away as an opportunity for Timon to speak with the princess. While Timon was gone, a snake invaded the colony and kidnapped Tatiana. As a result, Timon got blamed for abandoning his post and was exiled from the colony. He soon met and befriended Pumbaa, who was also an outcast due to his flatulence problem. Soon enough, the two came across Tatiana, who was held captive by the snake, and rescued her. When Timon and Tatiana returned to the colony with Pumbaa, Timon was offered to marry the princess and live in luxury, but that would mean abandoning Pumbaa. Therefore, he decided to stay with his friend and live a jaunty life, in which they decided to name "Hakuna Matata".

Pumbaa
In the episode "Russia Hour", Pumbaa is shown to have an uncle named Boaris, who is very famous in Russia due to his ballet dancing skills. But then, before Boaris' farewell performance, he falls on fish eggs due to Timon throwing it on the ground and goes to the hospital, leaving it up to Pumbaa to perform in his uncle's place. Pumbaa, however, breaks his leg, and Timon is forced to stall. But then, Boaris, presumably recovered from his injury, shows up and does his final performance.

In "Sense & Senegambia", Pumbaa is also revealed to have a deceased uncle named Ernie. In that same episode, Pumbaa believes he lost his bug-hunting skills after failing to catch and eat a cricket. Timon thinks this is because there is something wrong with the warthog's senses and so he purchases expensive aids for his friend. Pumbaa later learns from his dream of talking to Uncle Ernie that he needs to believe in himself and therefore, he regains his confidence and succeeds in catching bugs. In another episode "New Guinea Pig", it is shown that Pumbaa's tusks can get in his way of doing some activities or passing through some things. As a result, Pumbaa starts to get tired of them and considers trading them to the three natives. The warthog later realizes how useful his tusks are, as he uses them to free Timon and create an ice replica of himself. Pumbaa learns from Timon that his tusks are the most important parts of what makes him who he is. Also, years before the episode "Madagascar About You", an arranged marriage has been set up for Pumbaa before he was even born.

In "Home Is Where the Hog Is", it is revealed that Pumbaa was a member of a warthog sounder, where he had a mate named Sharla. He was banished from the sounder due to his flatulence, which was apparently appalling even by warthog standards, and spent his life as a loner until he met and befriended Timon.

The Lion King II: Simba's Pride

It is unclear whether Timon and Pumbaa have taken up residence at Pride Rock, or just make frequent visits. They serve as aides to Simba and are often called upon to protect his adventurous daughter Kiara, replacing Zazu's role as babysitters. Despite being bumbling, Simba trusts them to look after Kiara and does not blame them when Kiara escapes as Kiara is known to do so. 

A few years later when a now adolescent Kiara goes on her first hunt, they are hired to make sure she won't get hurt. Furious that Simba broke his promise to let her hunt alone, Kiara leaves the Pride Lands to hunt outside the boundary. Timon and Pumbaa also teach Kovu how to have fun after he forgets due to years of indoctrination in hatred. When Kovu's pride, the Outsiders, ambush Simba, Timon is on Simba's side instantly, not even wanting to hear Kovu's explanation. Afterwards, they discover that Kiara has left Pride Rock (having left to find Kovu) and reveal this to Simba, much to the latter's annoyance as he had forbidden Kiara to leave Pride Rock in order to stop her from seeing Kovu again. Timon and Pumbaa later assist Simba and his pride in the battle against Kovu's vengeful and bitter mother Zira, and the Outsiders, but get chased off and trapped by a group of Outsider lionesses, until Timon threatens to use Pumbaa's tail as a gun and use his gas on them causing them to flee in fear. When Simba tries to make peace with Zira after Kiara convinces him that both prides "were one", he uses the same advice Timon and Pumbaa gave him when he was a cub (put the past behind you) showing how much he had learned from his old friends.

Timon and Pumbaa then return to Pride Rock with the pride and witness Kiara marry Kovu.

The Lion King 1½

Timon and Pumbaa are the main characters in this follow-up, which reveals an alternative version of Timon's origin and how he first met Pumbaa. The two are also revealed to have passed by and caused some key events in the first film before their first appearance. Timon, his mother Ma, and Uncle Max were part of a group of meerkats who lived on the savannah, but he was unable to do any job to a good standard, and almost led to the meerkats being eaten by the hyenas Shenzi, Banzai and Ed. Miserable, he received counsel from Rafiki, who taught him the "Hakuna Matata" philosophy and told him to "look beyond what you see." Timon took this literally and set off to find the ultimate paradise. Along the way, he first encountered Pumbaa, and the two became friends. On the way to find paradise, they passed by the presentation of Simba (it turns out that Pumbaa accidentally passed some gas and the smell made an elephant trumpet and a few animals collapse, causing the other animals to think they were bowing and later they all bowed) and Mufasa was very puzzled at seeing this and his majordomo Zazu then tells him they are bowing to his son; Simba, Nala, and when the animals are singing "I Just Can't Wait To Be King" (it was Timon who hit an elephant's leg with a stick, causing the pyramid of animals to collapse); the elephant graveyard where Mufasa was on his way to save Simba and Nala from the hyenas ("I see carnivores"); the hyenas marching to "Be Prepared" ("something tells me this ain't the traveling company of Riverdance"); and the wildebeest stampede ("Shall we run for our lives?" "Oh yes, let's."). Finally, they reach a beautiful oasis and are enjoying life until they find an unconscious Simba. After rescuing Simba, Timon and Pumbaa find themselves as surrogate parents trying to keep up with the head-strong cub.

The film also shows more of Simba's life with Timon and Pumbaa before Nala came along, stating that Simba had beaten Timon in every bug-eating contest they had done with one another. Timon and Pumbaa, afraid that Nala would take away their friend, attempted to spoil Simba and Nala's date by letting out bees, a spider, and tripping the two (explaining why they fell down the hill in the first film), but all failed. Later on, they see Simba and Nala arguing. They also mistake the appearance of Mufasa's ghost as bad weather ("I think the storm is coming to a head"). After they realize Simba has gone back to take his rightful place as king, it is revealed that Pumbaa had set off to help Simba before Timon, who was unsupportive and angry. Timon eventually came to his senses thanks to Rafiki's continued advice, and quickly followed, after which Rafiki says, "My work here is done." After the duo provide their hula distraction, they encounter Ma and Uncle Max, who had been searching for Timon ever since he left the meerkat colony. Later on during the fight, they defeat the hyenas by digging a massive tunnel network, sending the hyenas down Pride Rock where they get to take revenge on Scar who had betrayed them. At the end, Timon takes his entire meerkat colony to live in the oasis, free from danger.

Despite the appearance of Timon's mother, Ma (who was also given reference in at least one episode of Timon & Pumbaa) and his Uncle Max, Timon's father is never mentioned. However, in deleted scenes, Timon's father is an active character, though he was apparently replaced by Uncle Max.

The Lion Guard

Timon and Pumbaa appear with several of the film's other characters in the Disney Junior series The Lion Guard, which centers around Simba & Nala's second-born cub, Kion. During the series, which is set within the time gap in The Lion King II: Simba's Pride, Timon and Pumbaa are adoptive uncles of a young honey badger named Bunga, who is one of the members of the Lion Guard. When Bunga was an infant, he encountered Timon and Pumbaa singing "Utamu". Instantly smitten, Bunga had begun following them around. Pumbaa wanted to keep Bunga, but Timon didn't want to raise anymore kids since he and Pumbaa have already done so with Simba, but the two friends see that the honey badger wants to be with them as well. Before he accepted Bunga, Timon instructed the honey badger to climb a tree and fetch them some Utamu grubs. When Bunga had succeeded and given the grubs to Timon, the meerkat had allowed him to stay, and the three have lived together ever since.

The Lion King (2019)

Billy Eichner and Seth Rogen played Timon and Pumbaa (in the first instance of the latter being voiced by somebody other than Sabella) respectively in the 2019 CGI remake of The Lion King. Director Jon Favreau encouraged Rogen and Eichner, who did their voice recordings together, to improvise a lot.

Eichner said that "It's such a great role that allows you to do so much. But I've learned that the bigger the project and the bigger the names that you're working with, the more you have to ignore it. If you get to the soundstage and you're thinking, 'Oh my God, what a full-circle moment! Nathan Lane did it originally! Beyoncé's in this!' then you're paralyzed creatively. You just have to put that out of your head in order to get the job done." Eichner also talked about having "what some may consider a gay sensibility" that he brought to the table when he voiced Timon.

Rogen said that "As an actor, I 100 percent don't think I'm right for every role—there are a lot of roles I don't think I'm right for even in movies I'm making—but Pumbaa was one I knew I could do well. Truthfully, I probably would have been a little insulted if [Favreau] didn't ask me to."

Among the movie's vocal performances, Eichner and Rogen received particular praise by critics,
 with A.V. Clubs A.A. Dowd proclaiming: "Ultimately, only Billy Eichner and Seth Rogen, as slacker sidekicks Timon and Pumbaa, make much of an impression; their funny, possibly ad-libbed banter feels both fresh and true to the spirit of the characters—the perfect remake recipe."

Other appearances

Timon and Pumbaa made regular appearances in the animated television series Disney's House of Mouse (2001–2002) as guests and also appeared in Mickey's Magical Christmas: Snowed in at the House of Mouse. An occasional running gag in the show involved Timon trying to eat Jiminy Cricket, only to be stopped by Pumbaa.

The two have made cameos in other Disney films and TV series. In Aladdin and the King of Thieves, the Genie turns into Pumbaa in a scene saying, "Hakuna Matata". Timon appears in the Virtual Magic Carpet Ride game included on disc 2 of the 2004 Aladdin Platinum Edition DVD. In Enchanted, Pip accidentally transforms himself momentarily into Pumbaa in the DVD extra "Pip's Predicament: A Pop-Up Adventure". Pumbaa makes a cameo appearance in the "Good Neighbor Cruella" episode of 101 Dalmatians: The Series. Both characters make a cameo appearance in the Lilo & Stitch: The Series finale film, Leroy & Stitch, hidden among Stitch's experiment "cousins" in the climax. In The Jungle Book 2, two animals resembling Timon and Pumbaa can briefly be seen dancing during the song "W-I-L-D" until Baloo knocks them off the wall with his backside. Rogen reprises the 2019 film version of Pumbaa in the 2022 film Chip 'n Dale: Rescue Rangers, who appears in a scene with several other characters also voiced by Rogen.

The duo also appeared within the Timon and Pumbaa’s Virtual Safari series of interactive virtual games. Produced by Buena Vista Home Entertainment, Disney Feature Animation, and DisneyToon Studios, these DVD bonus-feature games were included within Disney's The Lion King-related DVD releases throughout the 2000's. Ernie Sabella reprised the voice of Pumbaa and Kevin Schon voiced Timon for the first game. Nathan Lane returned to voice Timon for the latter Virtual Safari installments.

Timon and Pumbaa were featured in a series of commercials that were part of the Smart Yet Satisfying PSA Campaign. These commercials were co-developed by Disney, Team Nutrition, and the United States Department of Agriculture. They are all animated in the style of the 1995 TV show (and by extension, the style of a typical Disney Afternoon cartoon).

Timon and Pumbaa, along with a young Simba, appeared on the packaging of the Kellogg's cereal "Chocolate Mud & Bugs", which was themed around them.

The two were referenced in The Black Eyed Peas and J Balvin song Ritmo (Bad Boys for Life).

Video games
Timon and Pumbaa reprise their roles from The Lion King in the 2006 video game Kingdom Hearts II. They charge in to battle the hyenas, and are saved by the game's main protagonists Sora, Donald Duck, and Goofy. After Simba's coronation, they fear that Simba will forget them and let the other lions eat them, though Sora assures them that Simba will never forget them. Pumbaa later shows his bravery by standing between a pregnant Nala and Scar's "ghost". Ernie Sabella reprises his role as Pumbaa, while Timon is voiced by Bruce Lanoil. Coincidentally, Quinton Flynn also had a role in the game, providing the voice for Axel of Organization XIII.

Timon and Pumbaa are playable characters to unlock for a limited time in Disney Magic Kingdoms.

Walt Disney Parks and Resorts
Timon appears at Walt Disney Parks and Resorts as a meetable character in Adventureland and at Disney’s Animal Kingdom, while Pumbaa occasionally appears on show or parade floats. At Walt Disney World, the two appear in signage explaining the park's safety policies to visitors. They were similarly featured on the Disney Safety website which was created in conjunction with Animax Entertainment until its closure. Timon and Pumbaa were main characters in The Legend of the Lion King, a defunct Fantasyland attraction in Walt Disney World's Magic Kingdom, which retold the story of the film using fully articulated puppets. The two also make cameo appearances in the Hong Kong Disneyland and the Disneyland versions of It's a Small World. They appeared along with Simba in the film Circle of Life: An Environmental Fable, an edutainment film at Epcot's Land Pavilion that ran from 1995 to 2018. Timon and Pumbaa both feature in Festival of the Lion King at Animal Kingdom, voiced by Kevin Schon and Ernie Sabella.

Educational shorts
Timon and Pumbaa were featured in a series of educational short called Find Out Why, sponsored by the National Science Foundation. These shorts involved Timon and Pumbaa answering kids' questions about science, such as why there is lightning, why we sneeze, why pandas don't live in deserts, why there is wind, and why an airplane flies. The shorts were interstitial segments of the Saturday morning cartoon block Disney's One Saturday Morning in 2000. The series contained of nine shorts, five of which were featured in the extras at Disc 2 of the 1998 film's Special Edition DVD in 2004.

Disney Educational Productions and Underwriters Laboratories co-produced an educational film series called Wild About Safety: Safety Smart with Timon and Pumbaa, where Pumbaa educated Timon on how to stay safe. Ernie Sabella reprised his role as Pumbaa, while Timon was voiced by Bruce Lanoil. The series ran from 2008 to 2013. Each installment is approximately 12 minutes long. They are all somewhat animated in the style of the 1994 film, with occasional use of stock footage from the movie, as well as Tony Bancroft, who animated Pumbaa in the film, returning as an animator for the series. 
The following titles were produced:
Wild About Safety: Safety Smart At Home! (2008)
Wild About Safety: Safety Smart Goes Green! (2009)
Wild About Safety: Safety Smart In The Water! (2009)
Wild About Safety: Safety Smart About Fire! (2009)
Wild About Safety: Safety Smart Healthy and Fit! (2010)
Wild About Safety: Safety Smart Online! (2012)
Wild About Safety: Safety Smart Honest & Real! (2013)
Wild About Safety: Safety Smart On The Go! (2013)

References

The Lion King (franchise) characters
Fictional insectivores
Fictional warthogs
Fictional mongooses
Male characters in animated films
Film characters introduced in 1994
Animated characters introduced in 1994
Film sidekicks
Animated duos